"Playing with Fire" is a hip hop song composed and performed by British rapper Plan B, featuring vocals from the track's producer and mixer, Labrinth. The song was released on 3 December 2012 as the fourth and final single from the ill Manors soundtrack, a film which Plan B also directed.

Background
The track was originally due to be released as the album's third single, with an official lyric video being posted to YouTube shortly before the album's release on 23 July 2012. However, due to the continuing promotion of collaborator Labrinth's debut album, Electronic Earth, a music video was unable to filmed, and thus, the release was cancelled in favour of "Deepest Shame".

In August 2012, Labrinth confirmed that the track would be released as a single later in the year. On 31 October, Drew confirmed the release of the track as a single on 3 December, and also premiered the High Contrast remix that would make up part of the digital release. A day later, the official music video for the track premiered. On 30 October 2012, the High Contrast remix was released as a free download on Plan B's official SoundCloud page. As of May 2013, it has over 4,500 downloads. On 30 November 2012, the High Contrast remix was released on iTunes as a single.

Music video
The music video for "Playing with Fire" was directed by Colin Tilley, and premiered on YouTube on 1 November 2012. The video features footage of the character Jake from ill Manors, intertwined with new images of Drew and Labrinth performing the song beneath a derelict tower block. A number of backing dancers begin to combust and set themselves on fire, with both Drew and Labrinth also ending up on fire by the end of the video. Backing vocalist Etta Bond and Labrinth's brother MckNasty also feature in the video.

Track listing
 Digital download single
 "Playing with Fire" (High Contrast remix) – 5:22

 Promotional CD single
 "Playing with Fire" (radio edit) – 3:37

Charts

Personnel
 Plan B – vocals, producer
 Labrinth – vocals, producer, additional mixing
 Etta Bond – backing vocals
 Jimmy Robertson – additional engineer
 Al Shux – mixing
 John Davis – mastering

References

2012 singles
679 Artists singles
Atlantic Records UK singles
Plan B (musician) songs
Songs written by Plan B (musician)
Song recordings produced by Labrinth
2012 songs
Songs written by Labrinth